The 6th Marine Division was a United States Marine Corps World War II infantry division formed in September 1944.  During the invasion of Okinawa it saw combat at Yae-Take and Sugar Loaf Hill and was awarded a Presidential Unit Citation. The 6th Division had also prepared for the invasion of Japan before the war ended.  After the war it served in Tsingtao, China, where the division was disbanded on April 1, 1946, being the only Marine division to be formed and disbanded overseas and never set foot in the United States.

World War II

Formation on the Solomon Islands
The 6th Marine Division was activated on Guadalcanal in the southern Solomon Islands on September 7, 1944. The 6th Division was formed from three infantry regiments, the 4th, 22nd, and 29th Marines and other units such as engineer, medical, pioneer, motor transport, tank, headquarters, and service battalions. The core cadre around which the division was formed was the former 1st Provisional Marine Brigade which included the 4th and 22nd Marine Regiments, plus their supporting artillery battalions; these artillery battalions were later consolidated into the 15th Marine Regiment.

The Battle of Guam ended in August 1944 and the 1st Provisional Marine Brigade was called to Guadalcanal along with the 1st Battalion, 29th Marines, which had served with the 2nd Marine Division in the Battle of Saipan on the Mariana Islands. With a core of all these veterans incorporated into the new division, the 6th was not considered "green" despite being a new formation; most of the men were veterans of at least one campaign and many were serving a second combat tour, half the forces in the three Infantry Regiments were all veterans, and some units even consisted of 70% veterans. The 2nd and 3rd Battalions, 29th Marines, disembarked from the United States on 1 August 1944, and landed on Guadalcanal on 7 September 1944 to further augment the division. The now fully manned 6th Division underwent "rugged" training on Guadalcanal between October and January before it shipped 6,000 miles to land as part of the III Amphibious Corps on Okinawa on 1 April 1945.

Okinawa

The division's initial objectives in the amphibious landing were the capture of Yontan Airfield and protection of the left (north) flank. Despite a Japanese battalion in their zone the division met only light resistance. By the third day, the division was approaching Iskhikawa, twelve days ahead of schedule. By 14 April, the division had swept all through the northern Ishikawa Isthmus, 55 miles from the original landings. The division's rapid advance continued until eventually they encountered prepared and dug-in defenders at Yae-Take, where the majority of the Udo Force was entrenched. The Udo Force, or Kunigami Detachment, under Colonel Takehiko Udo was built around the 2nd Infantry Unit of the 44th Independent Mixed Brigade—reinforced by having absorbed both former sea-raiding suicide squadrons and remnants of the Battalion earlier destroyed by the 6th—was responsible for defense of the Motobu Peninsula and Ie Shima. The 6th Division's drive captured most of northern Okinawa and the Division won praise for its fast campaign – Brigadier General Oliver P. Smith wrote: "The campaign in the north should dispel the belief held by some that Marines are beach-bound and are not capable of rapid movement."

After heavy fighting in the south, the division was ordered to replace the Army 27th Infantry Division on the western flank. The 6th division advanced south to partake in the assault against the strong Japanese defense line, called the Shuri Line, that had been constructed across the southern coastline. The Shuri Line was located in hills that were honeycombed with caves and passages, and the Marines had to traverse the hills to cross the line. The division was ordered to capture the Sugar Loaf Hill Complex, 3 hills which formed the western anchor of the Shuri Line defense. The Marines that had assaulted the line were attacked by heavy Japanese mortar and artillery fire, which made it more difficult to secure the line. After a week of fighting, the hill had been taken.

After Sugarloaf the Division advanced through Naha, conducted a shore-to-shore amphibious assault on, and subsequent 10-day battle to capture, the Oroku peninsula (defended by Admiral Ōta's forces), and partook in mop-up operations in the south. The battle on Okinawa ended on 21 June 1945. The Sixth division was credited with over 23,839 enemy soldiers killed or captured, and with helping to capture  of the island, but at the cost of heavy casualties, including 576 casualties on one day (May 16) alone, a day described as the "bitterest" fighting of the Okinawa campaign where "the regiments had attacked with all the effort at their command and had been unsuccessful".

For its actions at Okinawa, the 6th Marine Division (and reinforcing units) earned a Presidential Unit Citation. The citation reads:

During the war, the 6th Marine Division had two Seabee Battalions posted to it. The 53rd Naval Construction Battalion (NCB) was a component of the 1st Provisional Marine Brigade. Later the 58th NCB replaced them for the invasion of Okinawa. (see: Seabees)

Guam and China
In July 1945, the 6th division was withdrawn from Okinawa to the island of Guam to prepare for Operation Coronet, the planned invasion of Honshū, Japan that was supposed to occur in March 1946 but the Japanese surrendered in August 1945. While the 4th Marines were sent for brief occupation duty in Japan, the rest of the 6th spent September in Guam preparing for duty in China.

The division arrived in Tsingtao, China on 11 October 1945 where it remained until it was disbanded on April 1, 1946, being replaced by the 3d Marine Brigade. In its time at Tsingtao the division not only accepted the surrender of local Japanese forces (on October 25) but also oversaw their subsequent repatriation to Japan; prevented the communists from attacking the surrendered Japanese forces and dissuaded communist forces from advancing on the city, restored and maintained order, and came to be seen as the protector of minority groups in the former German concession.

Command structure
The 6th Division had two commanders during its short existence:

Major General Lemuel C. Shepherd, Jr., 7 September 1944 – 24 December 1945
Major General Archie F. Howard, 24 December 1945 – 1 April 1946

Assistant Division Commander
Brigadier General William T. Clement, November 1944 – 1 April 1946

Chief of Staff

Colonel John T. Walker, 7 September 1944 – 16 November 1944
Colonel John C. McQueen, 17 November 1944 – 16 February 1946
Colonel Harry E. Dunkelberger, 17 February 1946 – 1 April 1946

Personnel Officer (G-1)

Major Addison B. Overstreet, 7 September 1944 – 22 July 1945
Colonel Karl K. Louther, 23 July 1945 – 17 November 1945
Lieutenant Colonel Frederick Belton, 18 November 1945 – 31 March 1946

Intelligence Officer (G-2)

Lieutenant Colonel August Larson, 7 September 1944 – 30 September 1944
Major William R. Watson, Jr., 1 October 1944 – 9 November 1944
Lieutenant Colonel Thomas E. Williams, 10 November 1944 – 16 February 1946
Lieutenant Colonel Carl V. Larsen, 17 February – 31 March 1946

Operations Officer (G-3)

Lieutenant Colonel Thomas A. Culhane, Jr., 7 September 1944 – 10 November 1944
Lieutenant Colonel Victor H. Krulak, 11 November 1944 – 26 October 1945
Lieutenant Colonel Wayne H. Adams, 27 October 1945 – 31 December 1945
Lieutenant Colonel George W. Killen, 1 January 1946 – 31 March 1946

Logistics Officer (G-4)

Lieutenant Colonel August Larson, 1 October 1944 – 17 May 1945 
Lieutenant Colonel Wayne H. Adams, 18 May 1945 – 31 December 1945
Lieutenant Colonel Samuel R. Shaw, 1 January 1946 – 31 March 1946

Subordinate units
4th Marine Regiment

Colonel Alan Shapley, 7 September 1944 – 3 July 1945
Lieutenant Colonel Fred D. Beans, 4 July 1945 – 28 January 1946

15th Marine Regiment

Colonel Wilburt S. Brown, 23 October 1944 – 17 November 1944
Colonel Robert B. Luckey, 18 November 1944 – 15 March 1946

22nd Marine Regiment

Colonel Merlin F. Schneider, 7 September 1944 – 16 May 1945
Colonel Harold C. Roberts, 17 May 1945 – 18 June 1945 (KIA)
Lieutenant Colonel August Larson, 19 June 1945 – 24 June 1945
Colonel John D. Blanchard, 25 June 1945 – 31 March 1946

29th Marine Regiment

Colonel Victor Bleasdale, 7 September 1944 – 14 April 1945
Colonel William J. Whaling, 15 April 1945 – 31 March 1946

6th Tank Battalion

Major Harry T. Milne, 29 September 1944 – 16 October 1944
Lieutenant Colonel Robert L. Denig Jr., 17 October 1944 – 26 March 1946

Campaign and award streamers

Medal of Honor recipients
The Medal of Honor was awarded to five Marines and one Navy corpsman assigned to the 6th Marine Division during World  War II:

Richard E. Bush
Henry A. Courtney Jr., USMCR (posthumous)
James L. Day
Harold Gonsalves (posthumous)
Fred F. Lester, USN (posthumous)
Robert M. McTureous Jr. (posthumous)

See also
6th Marine Division on Okinawa film
List of United States Marine Corps divisions
Organization of the United States Marine Corps

Notes

References
Bibliography

, transcription also available here

 Available at The Military and Wars website, Something about everything military series, Okinawa: Sugar Loaf Hill webpage

Web

Sixth Marine Division Association's website

Further reading
 full text online
  1st (1948) Edition published by Infantry Journal Press, Washington, DC.  1987 reprint published by Battery Press, Nashville, TN

External links

Japanese flag captured by the 6th Marines on Okinawa and signed by 30+ Marines at surrender in China

Divisions of the United States Marine Corps
Military units and formations established in 1944
Inactive units of the United States Marine Corps
United States Marine Corps divisions during World War II
Military units and formations of the United States Marine Corps in World War II